António Luciano Pacheco de Sousa Franco, GCC, GCSE (Lisbon, September 21, 1942 – Matosinhos, June 9, 2004) was a Portuguese economist and politician.

Background
He was a son of António de Sousa Franco and wife Maria de Jesus Pacheco, in turn sister of Óscar Pacheco (Setúbal, São Julião, August 10, 1904 – February 17, 1970), Isabel Pacheco and Clóvis Pacheco and daughter of Joaquim Pacheco, born in Setúbal, and wife Deolinda Baptista.

Career
He was a Licentiate, Doctorate and Full Professor of Law from the Faculty of Law of the University of Lisbon.

He joined the Popular Democratic Party, who adopted the name of Social Democratic Party, in 1976. In 1978, he was the interim leader of the party, due to Francisco Sá Carneiro absence. He latter left the party and was Minister of Finance at Maria de Lurdes Pintasilgo government, in 1979.

He was the President of Portuguese Court of Auditors (Tribunal de Contas) and come close to the Socialist Party, during Aníbal Cavaco Silva governments. He was Finance Minister in the first socialist government led by António Guterres, from 1995 to 1999. In that year he returned to his academic career and became the new President of the Directive Council of his Faculty.

He was critical of the socialists in the following years, but accepted to be the top candidate the Socialist Party list for the 2004 European Parliament election.

Death

During a campaign event for the 2004 European elections in a fishing facility in Matosinhos, Sousa Franco and his entourage were engulfed by a violent clash between members of two local factions of the Socialist Party. During the incident, Sousa Franco suffered a heart attack. He was rushed to the nearby Pedro Hispano Hospital, being pronounced dead shortly after arrival.

He was succeeded as socialist top candidate by António Costa.

Decorations
He was awarded with the Grand Crosses of the Order of Christ and the Order of Saint James of the Sword.

Family
He married in Coimbra at the Old Cathedral Maria Matilde Pessoa de Magalhães Figueiredo, born at São Domingos de Benfica, Lisbon, on July 8, 1943, a Licentiate in History, daughter of João Correia de Magalhães de Figueiredo (Vouzela, Vouzela, March 2, 1908), a decorated Portuguese Army Officer, and wife (m. Lisbon, Benfica, July 27, 1935) Carlota Matilde Sérgio Pessoa (Lisbon, São Jorge de Arroios, November 19, 1912 – Lisbon, February 11, 2006), a maternal niece of António Sérgio, without issue. She was previously married in Lisbon, São Domingos de Benfica, on May 8, 1971, marriage later annulled by the Holy See, to António Manuel Delgado Tamagnini (b. Tomar, Santa Maria dos Olivais, December 5, 1942), a lawyer, by whom she had an only daughter, Inês Pessoa de Figueiredo Tamagnini (b. Lisbon, São Sebastião da Pedreira, December 4, 1973), unmarried and without issue. She is the sister of Eduardo Sérgio Pessoa de Magalhães Figueiredo, 2nd Baron of a Costeira.

1942 births
2004 deaths
Finance ministers of Portugal
Portuguese Roman Catholics
Social Democratic Party (Portugal) politicians
Government ministers of Portugal
People from Lisbon